The Tamsui Red Castle is a 19th-century mansion in Tamsui District, New Taipei, Taiwan.

History
The building was originally called Daguanlo and was planned in 1895 and built in 1899 during the Japanese rule of Taiwan as an accommodation for a local rich businessperson, Mr. Li. It was then later on taken over by the chairperson of Tamsui Street, Mr. Hung, after the decline of Mr. Li's family business. Afterwards, the building had been experiencing many changes throughout the time until recently it has been converted into a Chinese restaurant and café.

Architecture
The building is a three-story structure with Victorian architecture style. It has three-sided corridor constructed with red bricks. The ground and first floor is dedicated for a restaurant and the top most floor is dedicated for a café.

Transportation
The building is accessible within walking distance northwest of Tamsui Station of Taipei Metro.

See also
 List of tourist attractions in Taiwan

References

External links

 

1899 establishments in Taiwan
Buildings and structures in New Taipei
Houses in Taiwan
Restaurants in Taiwan